Brothers Home was an internment camp located in Pusan, South Korea during the 1970s and '80s. During its operation, it held 20 factories and thousands of people who were rounded up off of the street, the homeless some of whom were children, in addition to a college student who was protesting the regime. Only 10% of internees were actually homeless. The camp was home to some of the worst human rights abuses in South Korea during the period, which were exposed in Associated Press and CNN articles in 2016.

The South Korean government called the Brothers Home and other similar concentration camps opened by the Chun Doo-hwan regime during the fourth and fifth republics: "welfare centers".

A DW news article reports a minimum of 516 people died over the course of 20 years at Brother's Home. Widespread torture was common in these  welfare centers. In the 1990s, construction labourers dug up about 100 human bones on the patch of mountain just outside where it stood.

Involvement of the Protestant Church
The camp was operated in conjunction with the Protestant Church, with the church on the premises accommodating 3,500 people at any one time. Survivors allege close cooperation between the camp and the church on the premises. One former inmate reports being forced to perform in Christian plays for local and international guests and given Easter eggs as rewards; another was sent to the camp via a Christian missionary; and yet another describes the church and the camp as a business operation run by Pastor Lim Young-soon and Director Park In-keun (a former boxer and soldier), with children forced to work and run an on-premises Korean adoption operation, including writing letters soliciting donations from families who have adopted children in the past. Some of the adoption partners abroad were also part of Christian organizations.

Aftermath
Park was eventually sentenced to two and a half years in prison only for embezzlement.

See also

 Chun Doo Hwan
 Yodok concentration camp

References

Busan
Internment camps
Far-right politics in South Korea